Clash is a collaborative album between Holger Czukay and Dr. Walker, released in 1997 through Sideburn Recordings.

Track listing

Personnel 
Holger Czukay – sampler, engineering, mastering
Ursula Kloss – design, illustrations
 Ingmar Koch (as Dr. Walker) – sampler, Roland TR-808, mixing

References

External links 
 

1997 albums
Holger Czukay albums